Daniel Beckmann (born 1980) is a German organist at Mainz Cathedral.

References

1980 births
German classical organists
German male organists
Cathedral organists
Hochschule für Musik Detmold alumni
People from Olpe (district)
Living people
21st-century organists
21st-century German male musicians
Male classical organists